Mu Guoguang (母國光, 1931–2012) was a Chinese opticist and former president of Nankai University.

Education 
He graduated from Department of Physics of Nankai University in 1952, and from then became a faculty member of the same university.

Career 
From 1985 to 1995 he served as the president of Nankai University. In 1991 he was elected as a member of Chinese Academy of Sciences. His research focused on white-light optical processing, optical pattern recognition, color film archive storage, false color coding and optical neural networks.

References

1931 births
2012 deaths
Deaths from lymphoma
Engineers from Liaoning
Members of the Chinese Academy of Sciences
Nankai University alumni
Academic staff of Nankai University
People from Huludao
Physicists from Liaoning
Presidents of Nankai University